Pirčiupiai is a village in  (Valkininkai) eldership, Varėna district municipality, Alytus County, Dzūkija region, Lithuania. According to the 2001 census, the village had a population of 103 people. At the 2011 census, the population was 75.

The village is known since 16th century, when Grand Dukes of Lithuania used it as hunting grounds. On June 3, 1944, a group of Nazi Germans were attacked by Soviet partisans in a nearby forest. The Germans sent a punishment squadron and burned alive almost all inhabitants of Pirčiupiai. On that day 119 people (including 49 children under age of 16) were killed and only 13 escaped from the Pirčiupiai massacre. The SS Commander Walter Titel of the 16th SS Police Regiment ordered that the civilians were burnt alive. The bodies were allowed to be buried only after a week on June 11, 1944. A monument, called "Mother of Pirčiupiai", was erected in 1960 and commemorates the event.

References

  Prisiminta Pirčiupių tragedija (Tragedy of Pirčiupiai remembered)

Villages in Varėna District Municipality
Collective punishment
Massacres in Lithuania